The Cotton Plant water tower is a historic elevated steel water tower located in Cotton Plant, Arkansas. It was built in 1935 by the Pittsburgh-Des Moines Steel Company in conjunction with the Public Works Administration as part of a project to improve the area's water supply. It was added to the National Register of Historic Places in 2008, as part of a multiple-property listing that included numerous other New Deal-era projects throughout Arkansas.

See also
Cotter water tower
Hampton Waterworks
McCrory Waterworks
Mineral Springs Waterworks
National Register of Historic Places listings in Woodruff County, Arkansas
Waldo Water Tower (Waldo, Arkansas)

References

External links
An Ambition to be Preferred: New Deal Recovery Efforts and Architecture in Arkansas, 1933-1943, By Holly Hope

Infrastructure completed in 1935
Towers completed in 1935
Water towers on the National Register of Historic Places in Arkansas
Public Works Administration in Arkansas
National Register of Historic Places in Woodruff County, Arkansas
1935 establishments in Arkansas